Manuel Ordas (born 21 February 1998) is a French-born Spanish rugby union player. He plays at fly-half for Bayonne in the Top 14.

References

External links
Allrugby Profile

1998 births
Living people
French rugby union players
Spanish rugby union players
Sportspeople from Bayonne
Rugby union fly-halves
Aviron Bayonnais players
Spain international rugby union players
French people of Spanish descent